This list of military aircraft of Germany includes prototype, pre-production, and operational types. No distinction is drawn here between different services until 1991.

In 1990, the various air arms of the former German Democratic Republic were absorbed by their counterparts in the Federal Republic of Germany. Some types that had been operated by the GDR were no longer in service by then, and these are so noted.

Before 1919 

 Albatros D.II 
 Albatros D.III
 Albatros D.V 
 Albatros D.Va
 Daimler L.6
 Fokker D.I
 Fokker D.II
 Fokker D.III
 Fokker D.IV
 Fokker D.V
 Fokker D.VI
 Fokker D.VII
 Fokker D.VIIF
 Fokker D.VIII 
 Fokker Dr.I
 Fokker E.I
 Fokker E.III
 Fokker E.IV
 Fokker E.V
 Halberstadt D.I 
 Halberstadt D.II
 Halberstadt D.III
 Halberstadt D.V
 Junkers D.I
 Kondor D.VI
 Kondor E.III
 Naglo D.II
 Pfalz D.III
 Pfalz D.IIIa
 Pfalz D.VIII
 Pfalz D.XII
 Pfalz D.XV
 Pfalz Dr.I
 Pfalz E.I
 Pfalz E.II
 Roland D.I
 Roland D.II
 Roland D.III
 Roland D.VI
 Siemens-Schuckert D.I
 Siemens-Schuckert D.II
 Siemens-Schuckert D.III
 Siemens-Schuckert D.IV
 Zeppelin-Lindau D.I

Bombers and ground-attack aircraft
 AEG DJ.I
 AEG G.I
 AEG G.II
 AEG G.III
 AEG G.IV
 Gotha G.V
 Junkers CL.I
 Zeppelin-Staaken R.VI

Patrol and reconnaissance
 AEG C.II
 AGO C.I
 AGO C.II
 AGO C.IV
 Albatros B.I
 Albatros B.II
 Albatros C.I
 Albatros C.III
 Albatros C.V
 Albatros C.VII
 Albatros C.IX
 Albatros C.X
 Albatros C.XII
 Aviatik B.I 
 Aviatik C.I
 Aviatik C.VI 
 DFW B.I
 DFW C.V
 Etrich Taube
 Halberstadt CL.II
 Halberstadt CL.IV (Hannover C.IV ?!)
 Hannover CL.II
 Hannover CL.III
 Hannover CL.IV
 Hannover C.V
 Hansa-Brandenburg W.12 
 Hansa-Brandenburg W.19 
 Hansa-Brandenburg W.29
 Hansa-Brandenburg W.33
 Junkers J.I
 LVG B.I
 LVG C.II
 Rumpler C.I
 Rumpler C.IV
 Rumpler Taube

Trainers
 Euler D.I

Experimental and research
 Fokker V 1
 Fokker V 2
 Fokker V 3 (reference has seven photographs)
 Fokker V 4
 Fokker V 5
 Fokker V 6
 Fokker V 7 and V 7/I, and V 7/II, and V 7/III, and V 7/IV
 Fokker V 9 and V 12, and V 14, and V 16, and V 33 
 Fokker V 17 and V 20, and V 21, and V 23, and V 25
 Fokker V 27 and V 37
 Junkers J 1 (pioneering all-metal aircraft)
 Junkers J 7 (single-seat all-metal fighter demonstration prototype)

1919–1945

Fighters and interceptors
 Arado Ar 64, fighter (biplane)
 Arado Ar 65, fighter/trainer (biplane – re-engined Ar 64)
 Arado Ar 67, fighter (biplane) (prototype)
 Arado Ar 68, fighter (biplane)
 Arado Ar 76, fighter (biplane) + trainer
 Arado Ar 80, fighter (prototype)
 Arado Ar 197, naval fighter (biplane – derived from Ar 68)
 Arado Ar 240, heavy fighter + attack, Zerstörer (Destroyer)
 Arado Ar 440, heavy fighter + attack, Zerstörer (Destroyer)
 Blohm & Voss BV 40, Fighter glider, interceptor
 Blohm & Voss BV 155, Day fighter, high-altitude interceptor (formerly Me 155)
 Bachem Ba 349 Natter (Adder or Viper), interceptor (rocket-engine)
 Dornier Do 10, (Do C1) fighter (prototype), 1931
 Dornier Do 29, prototype heavy fighter, Zerstörer
 Dornier Do 335 Pfeil (Arrow), fighter-bomber + night fighter (push-pull engine configuration)
 Dornier Do 435, fighter-bomber
 Dornier Do 635, Long-range reconnaissance
 Fieseler Fi 98, biplane dive bomber, 1936
 Focke-Wulf Fw 57, heavy fighter + bomber (prototype)
 Focke-Wulf Ta 152, interceptor (derived from Fw 190)
 Focke-Wulf Ta 154 Moskito (Mosquito), night-fighter
 Focke-Wulf Fw 159, fighter (prototype only)
 Focke-Wulf Ta 183, jet-engined fighter (prototype)
 Focke-Wulf Fw 187 Falke (Falcon), heavy fighter
 Focke-Wulf Fw 190 Würger (butcher-bird), fighter
 Heinkel He 37, fighter (biplane)
 Heinkel He 38, fighter (biplane)
 Heinkel He 43, fighter (biplane)
 Heinkel He 49, fighter (biplane)
 Heinkel He 51, fighter + close-support (biplane)
 Heinkel He 100, fighter
 Heinkel He 112, fighter
 Heinkel He 113, fighter (alternative propaganda designation for He 100)
 Heinkel He 162 Volksjäger (People's Fighter), fighter (jet-engined)
 Heinkel He 219 Uhu (Eagle-Owl), night-fighter
 Heinkel He 280, fighter (jet-engined)
 Henschel Hs 121, fighter + trainer (prototype)
 Henschel Hs 124, heavy fighter + bomber (prototype)
 Henschel Hs 125, fighter + trainer (prototype)
 Horten Ho 229, fighter-bomber (jet-powered flying-wing)
 Junkers Ju 248, re-designation of Me 263
 Messerschmitt Bf 109, fighter + night-fighter (often mis-designated as the "Me 109")
 Messerschmitt Bf 110, heavy fighter + night fighter + fighter-bomber + ground-attack
 Messerschmitt Me 163 Komet (Comet), interceptor (rocket-engined)
 Messerschmitt Me 209, fighter + speed-record aircraft (prototype)
 Messerschmitt Me 209-II, fighter (prototype – completely different from Me 209)
 Messerschmitt Me 210, heavy fighter + reconnaissance + ground-attack + fighter-bomber + dive bomber
 Messerschmitt Me 262 Schwalbe (Swallow), fighter + attack (jet-engined)
 Messerschmitt Me 263, interceptor (rocket-engined)
 Messerschmitt Me 265, heavy fighter prototype
 Messerschmitt Me 309, fighter (prototype)
 Messerschmitt Me 328, pulsejet fighter/attack aircraft (prototype)
 Messerschmitt Me 329, heavy fighter prototype
 Messerschmitt Me 410 Hornisse (Hornet), heavy fighter + reconnaissance + fighter-bomber + night-fighter
 Messerschmitt Me 609 heavy fighter + bomber (project)

Bombers and ground-attack aircraft
 Arado Ar 66, trainer + night ground attack
 Arado Ar 234 Blitz ('Lightning'), bomber + night-fighter (jet-engined)
 Blohm & Voss Ha 140, torpedo bomber floatplane (prototype)
 Blohm & Voss BV 237, dive bomber, ground attack (project)
 Dornier Do 11, (Do F) medium bomber, 1931
 Dornier Do 13, medium bomber, 1933
 Dornier Do 17 Fliegender Bleistift (Flying Pencil), bomber + recon + night-fighter
 Dornier Do 18, bomber + reconnaissance flying-boat, 1935
 Dornier Do 19, quad-engined heavy bomber (prototype)
 Dornier Do 22, torpedo bomber + reconnaissance seaplane
 Dornier Do 23, bomber
 Dornier Do 215, bomber + night-fighter
 Dornier Do 217, bomber + night-fighter
 Dornier Do 317
 Fieseler Fi 167, ship-borne torpedo bomber + reconnaissance (biplane)
 Focke-Wulf Fw 42, prototype bomber
 Focke-Wulf Fw 189 Uhu (Eagle Owl), reconnaissance
 Focke-Wulf Fw 191, heavy bomber prototype
 Focke-Wulf Fw 200 Condor, heavy bomber
 Focke-Wulf Ta 400, long-range bomber
 Heinkel He 45, bomber + trainer
 Heinkel He 50, reconnaissance + dive bomber (biplane)
 Heinkel He 111, bomber
 Heinkel He 177 Greif (Griffon), long-range bomber
 Heinkel He 274, high-altitude bomber, two prototypes completed post-war in France
 Heinkel He 277, never-built trans-oceanic range bomber, evolved into Amerika Bomber competitor
 Heinkel He 343, jet bomber/reconnaissance, design only
 Henschel Hs 123, ground-attack (biplane)
 Henschel Hs 127, bomber (prototype)
 Henschel Hs 129, ground-attack 
 Henschel Hs 130, high altitude reconnaissance + bomber (prototype)
 Henschel Hs 132, dive bomber (jet-engined) (prototype)
 Hütter Hü 136, dive-bomber (prototype)
 Junkers Ju 86, bomber + extreme high-altitude reconnaissance
 Junkers Ju 87 Stuka, dive-bomber + ground-attack
 Junkers Ju 88, bomber + reconnaissance + night-fighter
 Junkers Ju 89, heavy bomber (prototype)
 Junkers Ju 90, bomber (prototype)
 Junkers Ju 187, dive bomber (prototype)
 Junkers Ju 188, Rächer (Avenger), bomber + recon
 Junkers Ju 287, heavy bomber (jet-engined) (prototype)
 Junkers Ju 288, bomber (prototype)
 Junkers Ju 290, long-range bomber + recon
 Junkers Ju 388, bomber (prototype)
 Junkers Ju 390, long-range bomber (prototype), Amerika Bomber competitor
 Junkers Ju 488, heavy bomber project
 Junkers EF 132, heavy bomber project
 Messerschmitt Bf 162, bomber (prototype)
 Messerschmitt Me 264, long-range bomber (prototype), first-built and flown Amerika Bomber competitor

Patrol and reconnaissance
 Arado Ar 95, coastal patrol + attack (biplane seaplane)
 Arado Ar 196, ship-borne reconnaissance + coastal patrol (seaplane)
 Arado Ar 198, reconnaissance
 Arado Ar 231, fold-wing U-boat reconnaissance aircraft (prototype)
 Blohm & Voss BV 138 Fliegende Holzschuh, flying-boat (early versions designated as Ha 138)
 Blohm & Voss BV 141, reconnaissance (asymmetric)
 Blohm & Voss BV 142, reconnaissance + transport
 Blohm & Voss BV 222 long-range flying boat
 Blohm & Voss BV 238, flying-boat (prototype
 DFS 228, rocket-powered reconnaissance aircraft (prototype only)
 Dornier Do 16, previously Do J, better known as Wal (Whale), reconnaissance flying-boat
 Dornier Do 18 reconnaissance flying-boat
 Fieseler Fi 156 Storch (Stork), STOL reconnaissance aircraft
 Focke-Wulf Fw 62, ship-borne reconnaissance (biplane seaplane)
 Focke-Wulf Fw 200 Condor, transport + maritime patrol-bomber
 Focke-Wulf Fw 300 proposed long-range version of Fw 200
 Gotha Go 147, STOL reconnaissance (prototype)
 Heinkel He 46, reconnaissance
 Heinkel He 59, reconnaissance (biplane seaplane)
 Heinkel He 60, ship-borne reconnaissance (biplane seaplane)
 Heinkel He 114, reconnaissance seaplane
 Heinkel He 116, transport + reconnaissance
 Henschel Hs 126, reconnaissance
 Hütter Hü 211, reconnaissance and night fighter
 Junkers Ju 388 Störtebeker, reconnaissance + night-fighter
 Messerschmitt Bf 163 STOL reconnaissance aircraft (prototypes only)
 Messerschmitt Me 261, long-range reconnaissance
 Messerschmitt Me 321 Gigant, heavy transport glider
 Messerschmitt Me 323 Gigant, powered version of Me 321
 Siebel Si 201, STOL reconnaissance aircraft (prototype)

Transport and utility
 Arado Ar 232 Tausendfüssler, transport
 Blohm & Voss Ha 139, long-range seaplane
 Blohm & Voss BV 144, transport
 Blohm & Voss BV 222 Wiking (Viking), transport flying-boat
 DFS 230, transport glider
 DFS 331, transport glider (prototype)
 Dornier Do 12, Libelle seaplane
 Dornier Do 14, seaplane (prototype)
 Dornier Do 26, transport flying-boat
 Dornier Do 214, transport flying-boat (prototype)
 Gotha Go 146, small transport (twin-engine), 1935 
 Gotha Go 242, transport glider
 Gotha Go 244, transport
 Gotha Go 345, assault glider
 Gotha Ka 430, transport glider
 Heinkel He 70,  "Blitz" (Lightning), single-engine transport + mailplane, 1932 
 Heinkel He 115, general-purpose seaplane
 Junkers Ju 52 Tante Ju (Auntie Ju), transport + bomber
 Junkers Ju 252, transport
 Junkers Ju 322, transport glider
 Junkers Ju 352 Herkules (Hercules), transport
 Junkers W34, transport
 Klemm Kl 31, single-engine transport, 1931 
 Klemm Kl 32, single-engine transport, 1931 
 Klemm Kl 36, single-engine transport, 1934
 Messerschmitt Me 321 Gigant (Giant), transport glider
 Messerschmitt Me 323, transport. Motorised version of Me 321
 Siebel Fh 104 Hallore, medium transport
 Siebel Si 204, transport + aircrew trainer

Trainers
 Albatros Al 101
 Albatros Al 102
 Albatros Al 103
 Arado Ar 69, trainer (biplane) (prototypes), 1933 
 Arado Ar 96, trainer
 Arado Ar 199, seaplane trainer
 Arado Ar 396, trainer
 Bücker Bü 131 Jungmann (Young Man), trainer (biplane)
 Bücker Bü 133 Jungmeister (Young Champion), trainer + aerobatics (biplane)
 Bücker Bü 180 Student (Student), trainer
 Bücker Bü 181 Bestmann (Bestman), trainer + transport
 Bücker Bü 182 Kornett (Ensign), trainer
 Fieseler Fi 5 (F-5) acrobatic sportsplane + trainer, 1933
 Focke-Wulf Fw 44 Stieglitz (Goldfinch), trainer (biplane)
 Focke-Wulf Fw 56 Stösser (Falcon Hawk), trainer (parasol monoplane)
 Focke-Wulf Fw 58 Weihe (Kite), transport + trainer
 Gotha Go 145, trainer
 Heinkel He 72 Kadett (Cadet), trainer
 Heinkel He 74, fighter + advanced trainer (prototype)
 Heinkel He 172, trainer (prototype)
 Klemm Kl 35, sportplane + trainer, 1935 
 Messerschmitt Bf 108 Taifun (Typhoon), trainer + transport
 Siebel Si 202 "Hummel"  sportplane + trainer, 1938

Helicopters
 Flettner Fl 184 prototype reconnaissance helicopter
 Flettner Fl 185 prototype reconnaissance helicopter
 Flettner Fl 265 prototype reconnaissance helicopter
 Flettner Fl 282 Kolibri (Hummingbird), reconnaissance helicopter
 Flettner Fl 339 prototype reconnaissance helicopter
 Focke Achgelis Fa 223 Drache (Dragon), transport helicopter (prototype
 Focke Achgelis Fa 266 Hornisse (Hornet), helicopter (prototype)
 Focke Achgelis Fa 330, unpowered "gyrokite" (prototype)
 Focke Achgelis Fa 336 scout helicopter (prototype), 1944
 Focke-Wulf Fw 61, helicopter (prototype)
 Focke-Wulf Fw 186, autogiro reconnaissance aircraft (prototype)

Experimental and research
 DFS 39, Lippisch-designed tail-less research aircraft
 DFS 40, Lippisch-designed tail-less research aircraft
 DFS 194, rocket-powered research aircraft, forerunner of Me 163
 DFS 228, rocket-powered high altitude long range reconnaissance prototype
 DFS 332
 DFS 346, supersonic research aircraft (incomplete prototype only)
 Göppingen Gö 9 development aircraft for Do 335 Pfeil
 Heinkel He 176, pioneering liquid-fueled rocket-engined experimental aircraft (prototype)
 Heinkel He 178, pioneering jet-engined experimental aircraft
 Heinkel Lerche, VTOL experiment
 Lippisch P.13a, delta-winged ramjet powered fighter.
 Messerschmitt Me P.1101, variable-geometry jet fighter.

1946–1991

Fighters and interceptors

West Germany
 Hawker Sea Hawk
 Lockheed F-104F, G, TF-104G Starfighter
 McDonnell-Douglas F-4F, F, RF-4E Phantom II
 North American/Canadair CL-13 Sabre 5, 6, F-86K
 Republic F-84 Thunderstreak, RF-84F Thunderflash

East Germany
 Mikoyan-Gurevich MiG-15bis, UTI (DDR only)
 Mikoyan-Gurevich MiG-17F, PF (DDR only)
 Mikoyan-Gurevich MiG-19PF, PFM, PM, S, SF (DDR only)
 Mikoyan-Gurevich MiG-21F, F-13, FL, M, MF, PF, PFM, PFS, RF, SPS, SPSK, bis, UM, US, USM, UTI
 Mikoyan-Gurevich MiG-23BN, MF, ML, PFM, S, UB
 Mikoyan MiG-29, −29UBC
 Sukhoi Su-20
 Sukhoi Su-22, −22UM

Bombers and ground-attack aircraft

West Germany
 Panavia Tornado IDS
 Dornier Alpha Jet A
 Fiat G-91

East Germany
 Ilyushin Il-28, −28U (DDR only)

Patrol and reconnaissance

West Germany
 Breguet Atlantic I
 English Electric Canberra B.2 Used in ground mapping and Recon role
 Fairey Gannet A.S.4, T.5
 Grob Egrett II
 Grumman OV-1 Mohawk Evaluated only
 Lockheed RF-104G Starfighter

Transport and utility

West Germany
 Airbus A310
 Boeing 707
 Canadair Challenger
 Convair C-131 Samaritan
 de Havilland Heron 2D
 Dornier Do DS-10
 Dornier Do 27A, B
 Dornier Do 28A-1, D "Skyservant"
 Dornier 228-201
 Dornier Do 29
 Dornier Do 32E
 Dornier Do 34
Douglas A-26 Invader only used for target towing
Douglas C-47 Skytrain
 Douglas DC-6B
Grumman HU-16 Albatross
 HFB 320 Hansa Jet
 Learjet 35A, 36A
 LET L-410
Lockheed C-140 Jetstar
 Nord Noratlas
 North American OV-10B
 Percival Pembroke C54
 Pützer Elster B
 Transall C-160D
 VFW 614

East Germany
 Antonov An-2, −2S, −2T, −2TD (DDR only)
 Antonov An-12
 Antonov An-14 (DDR only)
 Antonov An-26
 Ilyushin Il-14 (DDR only)
 Ilyushin Il-18 (DDR only)
 Ilyushin Il-62
 LET Brigadyr (DDR only)
 Polikarpov Po-2 (DDR only)
 Tupolev Tu-124 (DDR only)
 Tupolev Tu-134
 Tupolev Tu-154M
 Yakovlev Yak-40 (DDR only)

Trainers

West Germany

 Cessna T-37B
 Dassault Breguet Dornier Alpha Jet 1A
 Fiat G.91 R-3, R-4, T-1
 Fouga CM.170 Magister, Potez-Heinkel CM-191
 Lockheed T-33A
 MBB Fan Ranger 2000
 North American T-6 Texan
Northrop T-38A Talon
 Piaggio P.149D
 Pilatus PC-9
 Piper Super Cub h
 RFB Fantrainer
 Siat Flamingo

East Germany
 Aero Albatros
 Aero L-29 Delfín (DDR only)
 Aero Super Aero 45S (DDR only)
 Yakovlev Yak-11 (DDR only)
 Yakovlev Yak-18 (DDR only)
 Zlin Z43 (DDR only)

Helicopters

West Germany
 Aérospatiale Alouette II
 Aérospatiale Dauphin N4
 Aérospatiale Djinn
 Aérospatiale SA 330 Puma
 Aérospatiale Super Puma
 Aérospatiale Cougar
 Bell 47G-2
UH-1D Iroquois/Bell 205/212
 Bölkow Bö 46
 Bristol Sycamore
 Hiller UH-12C
 MBB Bo 102
 MBB Bo 103
 MBB Bo 105A, BSH-1, C, M, VBH, P, PAH-1
 MBB Bo 106
 MBB Bo 115
 MBB/Kawasaki BK 117A-3M
 Merckle SM 67
 Saro Skeeters Mk. 50, Mk.51
Sikorsky CH-34A, C, G
 Westland Sea King HAS.41
 Sikorsky Skycrane
Sikorsky CH-53 Sea Stallion
Vertol H-21 Shawnee
 Wallis Venom
 Westland Lynx HAS 88

East Germany
 Kamov Ka-29
 Mil Mi-1 (DDR only)
 Mil Mi-2
 Mil Mi-4 (DDR only)
 Mil Mi-8, TB, S, Mi-9, Mi-17 
 Mil Mi-14BT, PL 
 Mil Mi-24

Experimental and research
 Dornier Do 31
 EWR VJ 101C
 VFW VAK 191B
 Hawker Kestrel F.(GA)1
 RFB X-114
 MBB Lampyridae

Other aircraft
 Gloster Meteor TT.20
 Hawker Sea Fury TT.20
 Panavia Tornado ECR

1991 onwards 

The reunified Germany's military aircraft consisted of a mix of East and West German Aircraft that were in service along with new aircraft acquired after combining. In 2004 the last remnants of the communist East German armed forces "NVA" have been given to neighbour countries of Germany, such as Poland.

Fighters and interceptors
 Eurofighter Typhoon
 McDonnell-Douglas F-4F Phantom II
 MiG-29G (sold to Poland in 2004)

Fighter bombers

Air Force
 Panavia Tornado IDS
 Panavia Tornado ECR

Navy
 Panavia Tornado IDS (transferred to air force in 2005)

Patrol and reconnaissance

Luftwaffe
 Panavia Tornado RECCE version with reconnaissance pod

Navy
 Breguet Atlantic, out of service
 P-3C Orion (with the most modern upgrades worldwide)

UAVs

Air Force
 EuroHawk (out of service)
 IAI Heron (on order)

Army
 Bombardier/Dornier CL 289
 EMT Aladin
 EMT Luna
 EMT Mikado
 Rheinmetall KZO

Transport and utility

Air Force
 Airbus A310 MRTT + VIP, out of service
 Airbus A319
 Airbus A321 
 Airbus A340-300 Two former Lufthansa, service entry 2009.
 Airbus ACJ350 XWB, service entry 1 x 2020, 2 x 2022
 Airbus Military A400M 
 Bombardier Global Express Ordered, replaced Challengers.
 Transall C-160D, out of service
 Ilyushin Il-62 Former Interflug, out of service.
 Tupolev Tu-134 Former Interflug, out of service.
 Tupolev Tu-154M Former NVA, out of service. One out of two modified for Open Skies.
 Let L-410 Turbolet Former NVA, out of service.

Navy
 Dornier 228-201

Trainers
 Cessna T-37B Tweet
 Northrop T-38A Talon
 Grob G 120
 Grob G 120TP

Helicopters

Army
 NHIndustries NH90 
 Eurocopter Tiger 
 Eurocopter EC-135 (Trainer)
 Bell UH-1D, out of service
 Eurocopter (MBB) BO-105P/M, out of service

Navy
 Westland Sea King
 Westland Lynx

Airforce
 Bell UH-1D, out of service
 Eurocopter Cougar AS532
 NHIndustries NH90 Sea Lion
 Sikorsky CH-53G/GS (extensive upgrades planned)
 Airbus Helicopters H145M

Experimental and research
 EADS Barracuda

See also 
 List of RLM aircraft designations
 List of aircraft of the WW2 Luftwaffe
 List of military aircraft of Japan

References

Bibliography
 Silvester, John. "Call to Arms: The Percival Sea Prince and Pembroke". Air Enthusiast, No. 55, Autumn 1994, pp. 56–61.

External links 
The archive about the assignment of persons and material of the German Air Force in the Second World War

Aircraft
Germany Military Aircraft